Josefov is a municipality and village in Sokolov District in the Karlovy Vary Region of the Czech Republic. It has about 400 inhabitants.

Administrative parts
Villages of Hřebeny, Luh nad Svatavou and Radvanov are administrative parts of Josefov.

Geography
It lies in the southwestern part of the Ore Mountains. The municipality is situated on the right bank of the Svatava River, which forms the eastern municipal border.

History

History of the area is connected with the Hartenberg Castle, which was probably built in 1196. The village of Josefov was founded in 1833 by Count Josef von Auersperg.

Sights
The most important monument of the municipality is the ruins of the Hartenberg Castle. It is open to the public.

References

External links

Villages in Sokolov District
Villages in the Ore Mountains